The Sapodilla Cayes are an uninhabited atoll in the Gulf of Honduras. They are in the Toledo District of Belize.

Geography
The Sapodilla Cayes are a system of cayes, or low sandy islands, that are part of the Mesoamerican Barrier Reef System.

Disputed islands
They are administered by Belize, but Guatemala claims that the Belize–Guatemala maritime boundary is northwest of the cayes. Honduras also lays a claim to the Sapodilla Cayes in its 1982 constitution.

Marine reserve
Sapodilla Cayes Marine Reserve is a national protected marine reserve declared over the Sapodilla Cayes. It was established in 1996 and is administered by the Fisheries Department of Belize.

References

External links

Marine reserves
Protected areas of Belize
Mesoamerican Barrier Reef System
Uninhabited islands of Belize
Nature conservation in Belize
Protected areas established in 1996
Disputed islands
Territorial disputes of Belize
Territorial disputes of Guatemala
Territorial disputes of Honduras
Belize–Guatemala border
Toledo District
Islands of Belize
Caribbean Sea